The Lone Creek Falls is near Sabie in Mpumalanga, South Africa. The waterfall plummets 70 m down into the Creek.

References

Waterfalls of South Africa
Landforms of Mpumalanga